Equus capensis (E. capensis), the Giant Cape zebra, is an extinct species of zebra that lived during the Pleistocene of South Africa. E. capensis was first described from the Cape Town region of South Africa in 1909.

A 2009 DNA study analyzed several museum specimens identified as Cape zebras and concluded that all specimens tested clustered within the plains zebra, Equus quagga, with E. q. quagga and E. q. burchelli, rather than belonging to a distinct species.

References

Pleistocene horses
Zebras
Taxa named by Robert Broom
Fossil taxa described in 1909
Pleistocene mammals of Africa